Listowel Emmets is a Gaelic Athletic Association club based in Listowel, County Kerry, Ireland. They play in Division 3 of the County Football league and in the Kerry Intermediate Football Championship. Players from the club also compete in the Kerry Senior Football Championship with the divisional side Feale Rangers Notable players from the club include Tim Kennelly, and his 2 sons Tadhg Kennelly and Noel Kennelly.

Honours

 North Kerry Senior Football Championship: (15) 1926, 1931, 1933, 1957, 1965, 1972, 1976, 1991, 1997, 1998, 2004, 2008, 2009, 2013, 2015
 Kerry Intermediate Football Championship: (1) 2002  Runners-Up 2007
 Kerry Junior Football Championship: (2) 1972, 1999

References

External links
Official Listowel GAA Club website
 Listowel GAA Photos

Gaelic games clubs in County Kerry
Gaelic football clubs in County Kerry
Listowel